Sex Pot may refer to:
 Sex Pot (1975 film), an Italian comedy directed by Giorgio Capitani
 Sex Pot (2009 film), a direct to DVD sex comedy produced by The Asylum, and written and directed by Eric Forsberg